Leonid Genrikhovich Zorin (3 November 1924 – 31 March 2020) was an Azerbaijani playwright. He was born in Baku, Soviet Union, and studied at Azerbaijan University and at the Maxim Gorky Literature Institute in Moscow. He is author of plays and screenplays. His most performed work is A Warsaw Melody (1967).

Selected filmography
 20,000 Leagues Across the Land (1960)
 Peace to Him Who Enters (1961)
 The Man from Nowhere (1961)
 Friends and Years (1965)
 The Ugly Story (1966)
 Stopwatch (1970)
 Grandmaster (1972)
 Kind Men (1979)
 The Transit (1982)
 The Pokrovsky Gate (1982)
 Royal Hunt (1990)

References

1924 births
2020 deaths
Writers from Baku
Soviet dramatists and playwrights
Male dramatists and playwrights
Soviet male writers
20th-century male writers
Russian dramatists and playwrights
Russian male writers
21st-century male writers
Communist Party of the Soviet Union members
Baku State University alumni
Maxim Gorky Literature Institute alumni